The Men's 10 kilometre sprint biathlon competition at the 2002 Winter Olympics was held on 13 February, at Soldier Hollow. Competitors raced over two 3.0 kilometre loops and one 4.0 kilometre loop of the skiing course, shooting two times, once prone and once standing. Each miss was penalized by requiring the competitor to race over a 150-metre penalty loop.

Results 

Ole Einar Bjørndalen, having won the men's 20 kilometre Individual race two days before, came in as one of the favourites. Bjørndalen was also the defending World Cup champion in the sprint, as well as the defending Olympic champion in the discipline. In addition, he had won the 2001 test event at Soldier Hollow, beating countryman Frode Andresen, and won one of the four World Cup sprints earlier in the season. Raphaël Poirée, the defending overall World Cup champion, had also won a World Cup sprint race in 2001/02, but neither Poirée nor Bjørndalen was leading the World Cup standings, which were closely contested between Andresen, Frank Luck and the defending World Champion in the distance, Pavel Rostovtsev.

Germans Ricco Groß and Sven Fischer set the early pace, both shooting clear on the first shoot, then missing one in the second, with Fischer pulling away over the last loop to lead his countryman by 25 seconds at the finish. Poirée led both of them after the first shoot, but put two shots wide on his final round, dropping him out of contention. Rovstovtsev, not skiing as quickly as Poirée, was also well placed after one shoot, but his one miss on the second left him five seconds behind Groß at the finish.

Andresen, fresh off a disappointment in the final round of shooting in the individual, was clear on the first shoot, and quick on the skis, but, like the individual, struggled on the last shoot, missing twice and ending up in 8th. The man starting directly behind him, Wolfgang Perner, was slower on the course, but didn't miss a shot, and just managed to edge Groß at the line, finishing 0.2 seconds ahead for, at the time, second place.

But Bjørndalen was still to come, and did not disappoint. The Norwegian shot clear at the opening attempt, but only left the range in 4th, behind Poirée, Andresen and Fischer. However, where all three of those had stumbled at the second shooting round, Bjørndalen made no mistake, shooting clear. He left the range 30 seconds ahead of his closest competitor, Fischer, and held that lead until the finish line for his second gold medal of the games.
 This was Bjørndalen's third Olympic gold medal, making him the first biathlete to achieve such a feat.

The race was held at 11:00.

References

Men's biathlon at the 2002 Winter Olympics